Mamadou Diallo (born November 16, 1954) is a retired triple jumper from Senegal. He competed for his native country at the 1984 Summer Olympics in Los Angeles, California, finishing in 12th place in the final rankings with a jump of 15.99 meters.

Achievements

References

External links
 sports-reference

1954 births
Athletes (track and field) at the 1984 Summer Olympics
Senegalese male triple jumpers
Living people
Olympic athletes of Senegal